Heliothis flavescens is a species of moth of the family Noctuidae first described by Anthonie Johannes Theodorus Janse in 1917. It is found in Africa, including South Africa and Eswatini.

References

Heliothis
Taxa_named_by_Anthonie_Johannes_Theodorus_Janse
Moths described in 1917